(born 26 December 1959) is a Japanese former ski jumper.

Career
His best-known finish was a Silver Medal in the Individual Normal Hill at the 1980 Winter Olympics in Lake Placid, New York, (Tied with Manfred Deckert of East Germany).

World Cup

Standings

Wins

External links
 
 

Japanese male ski jumpers
1959 births
Living people
Ski jumpers at the 1980 Winter Olympics
Ski jumpers at the 1984 Winter Olympics
Sportspeople from Hokkaido
Olympic ski jumpers of Japan
Olympic medalists in ski jumping
People from Otaru
Medalists at the 1980 Winter Olympics
Olympic silver medalists for Japan
20th-century Japanese people